Christiane Marquardt (born 13 November 1958 in Berlin) is a retired East German sprinter who specialized in the 400 metres.

At the 1978 European Championships she finished fifth in the 400 m and won a gold medal in 4 × 400 metres relay, together with Barbara Krug, Marita Koch und Christina Brehmer.

She represented the sports team TSC Berlin.

References

1958 births
Living people
East German female sprinters
Athletes from Berlin
People from East Berlin
European Athletics Championships medalists